Hymenobacter roseosalivarius  is a Gram-negative bacterium from the genus of Hymenobacter which has been isolated from soil and sandstone from the Antarctica.

References

Further reading

External links
Type strain of Hymenobacter roseosalivarius at BacDive -  the Bacterial Diversity Metadatabase

roseosalivarius
Bacteria described in 1999